Lars Myraune (born 5 August 1944 in Frosta) is a Norwegian military leader and politician for the Conservative Party. He was the mayor of Frosta from 2003 to 2009 and member of the Parliament of Norway, representing the constituency of Nord-Trøndelag, from 2009 to 2013.

Before becoming mayor he was ranked as a major general in the Royal Norwegian Air Force and NATO, where he was stationed both abroad and in Norway. He has also been a farmer.

Myraune was Norway's eldest MP (with a regular seat) elected in 2009, and was also the Conservative Party's first MP from Nord-Trøndelag since 1993. He sat in the Standing Committee on Transport and Communications, and was the Conservative Party's spokesperson on information technology and aviation. Myraune looks at rebuilding local government and more living local communities as his most important cases.

References

External links 

Conservative Party (Norway) politicians
Members of the Storting
Mayors of places in Nord-Trøndelag
Royal Norwegian Air Force generals
1944 births
Living people
Recipients of the Military Order of the Cross of the Eagle, Class IV
21st-century Norwegian politicians
People from Frosta